SINE can refer to :

 Short interspersed nuclear elements, a type of retrotransposon in DNA
 Selective inhibitors of nuclear export, a type of candidate cancer drug

See also
Sine (disambiguation)